Ramón Pez Ferro (born April 3, 1934) is a retired Cuban ambassador.

Career 
On July 26, 1953, under the command of :es:Abel Santamaría he took part in the occupation of the Hospital civil Saturnino Lora.
From  to  he was the first Ambassador in Kingston (Jamaica).
From  to  he was Ambassador in Ankara (Turkey).
On  he was Chairman of the International Commission of the National Assembly of People's Power and visited Turkey.

External links 

1934 births
Living people
Ambassadors of Cuba to Jamaica
Ambassadors of Cuba to Turkey
University of Havana alumni
People from Artemisa Province